The Squirrels is a historic estate located at Highland Falls in Orange County, New York. It was built about 1845 and is a two-story frame and clapboard structure with a multi-gabled roof.  A two-story frame wing was added to the original farmhouse in 1857 and the house redesigned by architect Calvert Vaux.  Also on the property is a one-story gatehouse with a mansard roof.  The estate was owned and the house expanded by John Bigelow (1817–1911).

It was listed on the National Register of Historic Places in 1982.

References

Houses on the National Register of Historic Places in New York (state)
Houses in Orange County, New York
National Register of Historic Places in Orange County, New York
Houses completed in 1845
Highland Falls, New York